Pseudarchasteridae is a family of echinoderms belonging to the order Paxillosida.

Genera:
 Gephyreaster Fisher, 1910
 Paragonaster Sladen, 1889
 Perissogonaster Fisher, 1913
 Pseudarchaster Sladen, 1889
 Skiaster Blake & Jagt, 2005

References

 
Paxillosida
Echinoderm families